Red Headed Stranger is a 1986 American Western drama film written and directed by William D. Wittliff. The film stars Willie Nelson and Morgan Fairchild. It is based on Nelson's album Red Headed Stranger (1975).

Cast
Willie Nelson as Julian Shay
Morgan Fairchild as Raysha Shay
Royal Dano as Larn Clavers
R. G. Armstrong as Sheriff Reese Scoby
Katharine Ross as Laurie
Sonny Carl Davis as Odie Claver

Plot
Preacher Julian Shay (Nelson) and his new bride Raysha (Fairchild) leave Philadelphia for Driscoll, Montana to replace a minister who tells Julian, "You'll be fighting the devil on his own ground here, sir."

Julian soon learns the town is under the control of Larn Clavers and his sons, who control the water supply. The preacher convinces Sheriff Scoby, the town's honest but fearful lawman, to stand up to the Clavers. He also gets the townspeople to re-excavate, and then guard, an old water well. A man protecting the well is murdered by Odie Clavers, one of Larn's sons. Odie is hanged for his crime.

Raysha hates living in Driscoll and contacts an old lover, who comes to Montana and takes her away from the town. Julian tracks down his wife and her lover, and he kills them both. The preacher then wanders about the west until meeting Laurie (Ross), a farm widow with a young son named Nathan. Julian helps Laurie and Nathan work their farm and considers settling down with them, but Sheriff Scoby finds him and convinces the repentant preacher to return to Driscoll and help bring the Clavers to justice.

Production
Wittliff met Willie Nelson in the late 1970s. Wittliff was a writer on Honeysuckle Rose (1980) and Barbarosa (1982), which both starred Nelson. Nelson played his Red Headed Stranger for Wittliff, and Wittliff agreed to write a script based on the musical storyline. Wittliff finished a draft in 1979 and Universal Studios green-lighted the film with a budget of $14 million. The studio wanted Robert Redford to play the "Red Headed Stranger," a role Nelson had envisioned for himself. It took two years, but Redford finally turned the part down. Nelson and Wittliff gave back their advances to buy the script back.

HBO took an interest in the script and budgeted $5 million to produce it. Sam Peckinpah was attached to direct the film, but Peckinpah was unhappy with the low budget and left the project. The project died at HBO and Nelson and Wittliff began to raise the $5 million on their own. The budget ended up at $1.8 million, coming from a diverse group of investors, including Bud Shrake and Darrell Royal.

Red Headed Stranger began production on April 29, 1985. The main set, a western town nicknamed "Willieville," had been built over the previous two years across the road from Nelson's golf course, thirty miles west of Austin, Texas. Most of the filming was done in "Willieville," but nine other locations around Central Texas were also used. Production wrapped on June 14, 1985.

Release
Red Headed Stranger debuted at the Denver International Film Festival in October 1985. Critical response was mediocre and called the movie "dull" (Variety) and "an insipid story" (The Denver Post). The film opened in Nelson and Wittliff's home state of Texas, where it received a warmer welcome. The movie then had a limited national release in larger cities such as Seattle, Washington and Philadelphia, Pennsylvania.

References

External links

1986 films
Films shot in Austin, Texas
Films based on albums
1980s English-language films
American Western (genre) films
American drama films
1980s American films
1986 drama films
1986 Western (genre) films